An interest rate guarantee (IRG) is an option on a forward rate agreement (FRA) that is handled over-the-counter (OTC).
A call IRG is called a borrower's IRG.  A put IRG is called a lender's IRG. As with all options, the seller has the obligation to fulfill the condition of the option.
When exercising a borrower's IRG, the holder has the option (but is not obliged) to take a loan with a predetermined amount at a predetermined interest rate (the strike of the option) on a predetermined time period.
When exercising a Lender's IRG, the holder has the option (but is not obliged) to make a loan with a predetermined amount at a predetermined interest rate (the strike of the option) on a predetermined time period.

External links 
accaglobal.com

Options (finance)
Fixed_income_analysis
Interest_rates